The  are a pair of early Kofun period (late 4th century AD) megalithic tumuli located in what is now part of the town of Aizubange, Fukushima in the southern Tōhoku region of Japan. The site was designated a National Historic Site of Japan in 1976.

Overview
The Kamegamori kofun is located in the northern part of Aizu on the west side of Aozu hamlet south of the Aga River, in a rural area surrounded by rice fields. It has a total length of 129.4 meters, with a rectangular portion length of 55.0 meters, and a rear circle diameter of 74.4 meters. It was built in three tiers with a horseshoe-shaped moat and dates from the latter portion of the Kofun period (the second half of the 4th century). It is the second largest keyhole-shaped kofun in the Tōhoku region after the Raijinyama Kofun in Miyagi Prefecture. The tumulus has not been fully excavated, but in a trial survey in 1992, fragments of cylindrical haniwa and fukiishi were uncovered. The mounds are covered in a dense growth of cryptomeria and on top of the circular portion of the tumulus is a Shinto shrine and a Buddhist chapel.

The Chinjumori kofun in orientated in the same southerly direction, approximately 100 meets to the south of the Kamegamori kofun. A portion of a surrounding moat has been found. It was partly excavated from 1990 to 1991, and is believed to date from slightly earlier than the Kamegamori kofun. It also has a small Shinto shrine on its summit.

The site is approximately 20 minutes by car from Aizu-Bange Station on the JR East Tadami Line. At present, there are no public facilities at the site.

See also
List of Historic Sites of Japan (Fukushima)

References

External links

Aizubange town home page 

Kofun
Archaeological sites in Japan
History of Fukushima Prefecture
Aizubange, Fukushima
Historic Sites of Japan